The 2021–22 St. Lawrence Saints Men's ice hockey season was the 82nd season of play for the program and the 61st season in the ECAC Hockey conference. The Saints represented the St. Lawrence University and were coached by Brent Brekke, in his 3rd season.

Season

After a stunning conference championship in 2021, St. Lawrence was hoping to continue the upwards swing but the team got off to a rotten start. Emil Zetterquist was a tower of strength in goal, holding opponents to an average of 2 goals a game in his first eight starts, but the team's offense was pitiful. Over the first month and a half of their season, the Saints scored more than 2 goals just once and ended up with twice as many ties as they had wins. The lack of scoring was a trend that continued throughout the entire season and prevented the Larries from being able to make any waves in their conference. On the other side of the puck, St. Lawrence's stable defense went through a rough patch in the middle of the season and their average goals allowed ballooned to more than double what it had been at the start.

In late January, the Saints finally recovered on the back end and gave Zetterquist the help he needed. In their final eleven games, St. Lawrence played .500 hockey, which enabled them to finish 8th in the conference and receive a home site for the First Round of the conference tournament.

The series against Brown pitted two fairly remedial offenses against one another but that did not prevent some drama from being created. After a solid win in the first game, St. Lawrence dropped the second in overtime. A deciding third match was required and the Bears, who averaged just over one and a half goals a game, built a 3–1 lead midway through the game. The Saints came storming back, however, and tied the score with less than 10 minutes to play. The pivotal game required overtime as well with every shot potentially ending someone's season. As it turned out, St. Lawrence only needed one chance because the first shot on goal in the extra session found its way into the net and the Saints advanced to the quarterfinals.

Since every higher-seed won in the opening round, St. Lawrence was set against top-seeded Quinnipiac in the second round. The Tournament-bound Bobcats had been a powerhouse in conference all season and looked like they were ready to trounce the Saints after a routine win in the first game. However, the Larries would not just lay down and the team fought back in the second match. The Saints scored twice early in the third period, taking a 3–1 edge and potentially setting up a third meeting. Quinnipiac rallied to tie the score but couldn't knock out St. Lawrence before the buzzer, forcing overtime. In the extra period, neither offense was particularly strong, with just 10 shots being recorded between the two, but it was the Larries who had more chances on goal. That trend continued in the second overtime and, as their shot total increased, it seemed like only a matter of time before the Saints broke through. Unfortunately, the team ran out of time in the 89th minute of play and St. Lawrence's valiant effort ended in defeat.

Departures

Recruiting

Roster
As of September 9, 2021.

Standings

Schedule and results

|-
!colspan=12 style=";" | Exhibition

|-
!colspan=12 style=";" | Regular Season

|-
!colspan=12 style=";" | 

|- align="center" bgcolor="#e0e0e0"
|colspan=12|St. Lawrence Won Series 2–1

|- align="center" bgcolor="#e0e0e0"
|colspan=12|St. Lawrence Lost Series 0–2

Scoring statistics

Goaltending statistics

Rankings

Note: USCHO did not release a poll in week 24.

References

2021–22
St. Lawrence Saints
St. Lawrence Saints
St. Lawrence Saints
St. Lawrence Saints